Officer Arjun Singh IPS Batch 2000 is a 2019 Hindi film, starring Priyanshu Chatterjee, Raai Laxmi, Govind Namdev, Vijay Raaz and Deepraj Rana. The film is directed by Arshad Siddqui and produced by Laxmi Narain Pandey Guruji. The film is based on important social issues and the present situation of the politics and police force. In the film Priyanshu Chatterjee Plays the role of a fearless police officer  and how he fights to get justice for a family by fighting against the system. The film released on 18 October 2019. The film grossed 4 lakh.

Cast 
Priyanshu Chatterjee as Arjun Pratap Singh, IPS
 Raai Laxmi as Durga Dayal Singh
Govind Namdev as minister  Balaknath Chaudhari
Vijay Raaz as Kundan
 Deepraj Rana

Soundtrack

Reception

References

External links
  

2019 films
Indian action drama films